Upsilon Carinae, Latinized from υ Carinae, is a double star in the southern constellation of Carina. It is part of the Diamond Cross asterism in southern Carina. The Upsilon Carinae system has a combined apparent magnitude of +2.97 and is approximately 1,400 light years (440 parsecs) from Earth.

The primary component, υ Carinae A, has a stellar classification of A8 Ib, making it a supergiant star that has exhausted the hydrogen at its core and evolved away from its brief main sequence lifetime as an O9 V star. With an apparent magnitude of +3.08, it has an effective temperature of about 7,600 K, giving it a white hue. The companion, υ Carinae B, is a giant star with a classification of B7 III, although Mandrini and Niemela (1986) suggested it may be a subgiant star with a classification of B4–5 IV. The outer envelope of this star has an effective temperature of around 23,000 K, resulting in the blue-white hue of a B-type star.

The two stars have an angular separation of 5.030 arcseconds. As a binary star system, they would have an estimated orbital period of at least 19,500 years and a present-day separation of around 2,000 Astronomical Units. This system is roughly 12 million years old.

In the next 7500 years, the south Celestial pole will pass close to these stars and Iota Carinae (8100 CE).

References

External links
 Southern Sky Photos

Carina (constellation)
Carinae, Upsilon
B-type subgiants
Double stars
A-type supergiants
048002
085123
3890
PD-64 01084